Curtis Hooper Fullerton (September 13, 1898 – January 9, 1975) was an American professional baseball pitcher with the Boston Red Sox of Major League Baseball. Fullerton played for the Red Sox from 1921–1925 and again in 1933. He was signed by the New York Yankees in 1925, but never played for the club. Instead, he was released to the Hollywood Stars in the Pacific Coast League where he played from 1926-1928. Following that, he played two seasons with the Portland Beavers from 1929-1930. He was traded to the Jersey City Skeeters in 1931. In 1933, he was re-signed to the Red Sox only to be released again in 1934 to Kansas City. He pitched in the Texas League for the Dallas Steers from 1936-1937. In 1938, he pitched his last stint in organized baseball for the Monroe (Louisiana) White States in the Class C Cotton States League.

In the six seasons of his Major League career, Fullerton posted a 10–37 record with 104 strikeouts and a 5.11 ERA in 115 appearances, including 43 starts, 18 complete games, three saves, 45 games finished, 211 walks, and 423.0 innings of work.

He was born in Ellsworth, Maine on September 13, 1898 to Charles L. Fullerton, a sea captain, and Marian Letitia (Hooper) Fullerton. In October 1934 he married Mary Mildred McGilvery. After his career in baseball, Fullerton returned to the Boston Naval Shipyard, where he worked as an electrician and welder. Fullerton died in Winthrop, Massachusetts at age 76.

He is the great-uncle of game designer Tracy Fullerton and comic book and video game writer Charlotte Fullerton.

Sources

Retrosheet
Society for American Baseball Research

Boston Red Sox players
Major League Baseball pitchers
Baseball players from Maine
People from Ellsworth, Maine
1898 births
1975 deaths